Antonio E. Molina (c. 1820 – 21 August 1899) was one of five interim mayors of Ponce, Puerto Rico, during the six-month period of 14 February 1854 to 24 July 1854.

Introduction to politics
In 1853, prior to becoming mayor, Molina (together with Esteban Vidal, Bienaventura Font, Salvador Coronas and Pedro Alfonso) had been members of the Ponce Municipal Assembly. At that time a member of the municipal assembly was called regidor.  The other four interim mayors during that six-month period were Julio Duboc, Escolástico Fuentes, Pablo Manfredi, and José Benito Paz Falcón.

Mayoral term
In 1854, an anonymous humorous and satirical brochure titled Ensaladillas appeared in Ponce which was not well received.  On 31 December 1854, the mayor of Ponce published an edict in the local newspaper that anyone caught reading or copying the brochure would be fined 4 pesos.

Death
Molina died in Ponce on 21 August 1899 and was interred at Cementerio Civil de Ponce.

See also

 List of Puerto Ricans
 List of mayors of Ponce, Puerto Rico

References

Further reading
 Fay Fowlie de Flores. Ponce, Perla del Sur: Una Bibliográfica Anotada. Second Edition. 1997. Ponce, Puerto Rico: Universidad de Puerto Rico en Ponce. p. 116. Item 589. 
 Felix Bernier Matos. Cromos ponceños. (por Fray Justo) Ponce, Puerto Rico: Imprenta "La Libertad." 1896. (Colegio Universitario Tecnológico de Ponce, CUTPO)

Mayors of Ponce, Puerto Rico
1820s births
Year of birth uncertain
Burials at Cementerio Civil de Ponce
1899 deaths